Donald Robertson  (1860 – 31 May 1942) was the first Public Service Commissioner in New Zealand. Prior to being the Public Service Commissioner, he was Secretary of the Post & Telegraph Department.

He wrote the Early History of the New Zealand Post Office. When he retired he lived in the south of France, but came back to New Zealand in the depression. He was born in Dunedin, and died in a Wanganui private hospital. Robertson married Edith Martin in 1883. They had two sons, Philip Robertson and Major H. D. Robertson of the NZMC.

References
Obituary Dominion 2 June 1942 (page 3)
Who's Who in New Zealand (2nd edition, 1925) 

1860 births
1942 deaths
New Zealand public servants
New Zealand Companions of the Imperial Service Order